DIT University, erstwhile Dehradun Institute of Technology, is a private university in Dehradun, India.

History

DIT University was founded by Naveen Agarwal in 1998. In 2012, UGC conferred the Autonomous Status to DIT, further in 2013 the Uttarakhand State Government declared DIT as DIT University. DIT University has been established by Govt. of Uttarakhand vide Act No.10 of 2013 dated 15 February 2013 and is recognised by the UGC under section 2(F) of the UGC Act, 1956.

Campus
DIT University's campus is located on the foothills of Mussoorie. Dehradun is located 240 kilometres north-east of Delhi. The area of the campus is 25 acres out of which 23 acres is developed, the prominent buildings are Vedanta, Chanakya and Civil block. There is a 2 acre ground available for students, parking, and other facilities are also available in DIT.

Academics

Admission

Admission to DIT University is offered to aspirant's based on their performance in JEE-Main for Engineering and Architecture Undergraduates, GATE for Graduate courses, CAT/MAT for MBA and Uttarakhand State Entrance Examination for Master of Computer Applications. DIT University is listed under Central counselling list of JEE-Main (earlier AIEEE). In 2013, many students were admitted to DITU via CSAB counselling apart from normal counselling held at DITU campus. From 2014, admissions to Post-Graduate and Doctoral Programs are entertained by DIT University Entrance Test-DUET and interview conducted by DIT University. Apart from this, GATE/NET qualified students shall be given more preference.

Academic programmes
DIT University has programs in Engineering, Architecture, Pharmacy, Management Studies, Computing.

Rankings

The National Institutional Ranking Framework (NIRF) ranked it 129 among engineering colleges in 2020.

Student life

Events

Youthopia

Youthopia is the annual cultural and technical inter-college festival of DITU. The prominent events include Battle of Bands, RoboWars, CodeHunt and Perceptrix.

Sphurti
Sphurti is the annual sports competition at the DITU campus. DITU invites colleges throughout India to participate in events including cricket, basketball, football, volleyball, track and field, badminton, table tennis. Since the first Sphurti, there are more than 80 colleges that have come to participate in Sphurti.

Vision 2k35
Aiming to promote Dr. A. P. J. Abdul Kalam's vision of an era when the youth of India would enrich the world with their social, technical and academic brilliance, Vision 2K35 is a DIT University's initiative, to reach out to Young India. Vision 2K35 is a national level youth summit wherein, students will explore and evaluate the potential of renewable and conserving energy infrastructure for the nation by implementing most innovative Technical Ideas, Energy Auditing & Audit Presentation. The theme of the summit is what role the youth can play in bringing India in the league of Superpowers by 2035.

References

External links
 

Technical universities and colleges in India
Private universities in India
Universities in Uttarakhand
Universities and colleges in Dehradun
1998 establishments in Uttar Pradesh
Educational institutions established in 1998